William Finn Miller (born 8 June 1996) is an English actor and former professional footballer.

Early life
Miller was born to television director Sam Miller and actress Janine Wood. He played football at Leyton Orient from the age of seven to 12. He first appeared in a documentary drama as Pieter Beijerinck, in a 2006 documentary drama, Krakatoa: The Last Days, directed by his father. He appear in further productions for a number of years before returning to football.

Acting career
Miller rose to fame when, at the age of 11, he was chosen out of 700 applicants for the titular role in Oliver Twist, the BBC One Christmas adaptation of the Charles Dickens classic of the same name, broadcast in December 2007.

Miller starred as the lead character Sean in the 2009 British children's miniseries Runaway, broadcast on BBC One, which was part of the CBBC season about homelessness.

Filmography
 Krakatoa: The Last Days (2006) as Pieter Beijerinck
 Oliver Twist (2007) as Oliver Twist
 Runaway (2009) as Sean
 The Kid (2010) as young Kevin

Football career

Having previously played youth football for Leyton Orient, Miller joined Tottenham's development centre when he was 14. He signed a contract when he was 16. He featured regularly for Tottenham's Under-16 team over the course of the 2012–13 season before joining Tottenham full-time in the summer of 2013.

On 21 September 2013, Miller was selected for an England under-18 squad for two matches against Hungary on 11 and 14 October 2013.

On 25 August 2016, Miller joined Burton Albion on loan. His first goal for the club came on 10 September of the same year, a late equaliser against Wolverhampton Wanderers. In January 2018, he injured his knee in a game against Queens Park Rangers, ending the season prematurely for him.
 
In 2018–19 season, he scored a goal in the 1–1 draw against Plymouth Argyle in December 2018. Miller left Burton Albion at the end of the contract in 2019.

In an interview with The Guardian in April 2020, Miller revealed that he has retired from football and is pursuing a career as a film-maker and musician.

Career statistics

References

External links

1996 births
Living people
English footballers
England youth international footballers
Association football midfielders
Leyton Orient F.C. players
Tottenham Hotspur F.C. players
Burton Albion F.C. players
English Football League players
English male film actors
English male television actors
English male child actors
Male actors from London